Johann Trestler (27 October 1887 – 30 August 1926) was an Austrian wrestler. He competed in the light heavyweight event at the 1912 Summer Olympics.

References

1887 births
1926 deaths
Olympic wrestlers of Austria
Wrestlers at the 1912 Summer Olympics
Austrian male sport wrestlers